Choropampa District is one of nineteen districts of the Chota Province, Peru. It is located in the Northern Peruvian highlands and renowned for its gold reserves, with South Americas largest goldmine operations.

An elemental mercury spill occurred in June 2000 along a road that passed through the three villages Choropampa, Magdalena and San Juan from a truck contracted by Yanacocha mining; the Compliance/Advisor Ombudsman of the International Finance Corporation /Multilateral Investment Guarantee Agency investigated, as described in the 2006 exit report.

References

External links
"Peasants in Peru near showdown on mercury spill", Miami Herald, 5 March 2005.
"The Curse of Inca Gold", Frontline/World, 30 min video and text, October 2005
'The Curse of Inca Gold': Mining Peru's Wealth, NPR's Day to Day, October 25, 2005